Alydidae, commonly known as broad-headed bugs, is a family of true bugs very similar to the closely related Coreidae (leaf-footed bugs and relatives). There are at least 60 genera and 300 species altogether. Distributed in the temperate and warmer regions of the Earth, most are tropical and subtropical animals; for example Europe has a mere 10 species, and only 2 of these occur outside the Mediterranean region.

Names
Broad-headed bugs are known as knobe in the Meto and Funai Helong languages of West Timor, Indonesia.

Description

Some have long and very thin legs. The most notable characteristics of the family are that the head is broad, often similar in length and width to the pronotum and the scutellum, and that the last antennal segments are elongated and curved. The compound eyes are globular and protruding, and they also have ocelli. The femora of the hindlegs bear several strong spines; the tarsus has three segments. Most species have well-developed hemelytra (forewings), allowing them to fly well, but in some the hemelytra are vestigial. The membranous part of the hemelytra have several closely spaced long veins.

Alydidae are generally of dusky or blackish coloration. The upperside of the abdomen is usually bright orange-red. this color patch is normally not visible as it is covered by the wings; it can be exposed, perhaps to warn would-be predators of these animals' noxiousness: They frequently have scent glands that produce a stink considered to be worse than that of true stink bugs (Pentatomidae). The stink is said to smell similar to a bad case of halitosis.

Sometimes the adults have  reduced wings. Both, nymphs and adults of some species, such as Dulichius inflatus and Hyalymenus spp. are ant mimics and live in ant nests.

Ecology
These bugs mainly inhabit fairly arid and sandy habitat, like seashores, heathland, steppe and savannas. Their main food is seeds, which they pierce with their proboscis to drink the nutritious fluids contained within. Some are economically significant pests, for example Leptocorisa oratoria on rice.

Systematics
Two major lineages are generally accepted as subfamilies; a third (the Leptocorisinae) is now placed as a tribe Leptocorisini of the Micrelytrinae.

Genera
These 60 genera belong to the family Alydidae:

 Acestra Dallas, 1852
 Alydus Fabricius, 1803
 Anacestra Hsiao, 1964
 Apidaurus Stål, 1870
 Bactrocoris Kormilev, 1953
 Bactrodosoma Stål, 1860
 Bactrophya Breddin, 1901
 Bactrophyamixia Brailovsky, 1991
 Bloeteocoris Ahmad, 1965
 Burtinus Stål, 1859
 Calamocoris Breddin, 1901
 Camptopus Amyot & Serville, 1843
 Cosmoleptus Stål, 1873
 Cydamus Stål, 1860
 Daclera Signoret, 1863
 Darmistus Stål, 1859
 Dulichius Stål, 1866
 Esperanza Barber, 1906
 Eudarmistus Breddin, 1903
 Euthetus Dallas, 1852
 Grypocephalus Hsiao, 1963
 Hamedius Stål, 1860
 Heegeria Reuter, 1881
 Hyalymenus Amyot & Serville, 1843
 Hypselopus Burmeister, 1835
 Leptocorisa Latreille, 1829
 Longicoris Ahmad, 1968
 Lyrnessus Stål, 1862
 Marcius Stål, 1865
 Megalotomus Fieber, 1860
 Melanacanthus Stål, 1873
 Micrelytra Laporte, 1833
 Mirperus Stål, 1860
 Mutusca Stål, 1866
 Nariscus Stål, 1866
 Nemausus Stål, 1866
 Neomegalotomus Schaffner & Schaefer, 1998
 Noliphus Stål, 1859
 Oxycranum Bergroth, 1910
 Paramarcius Hsiao, 1964
 Paraplesius Scott, 1874
 Planusocoris
 Protenor Stål, 1867
 Rimadarmistus Bliven, 1956
 Riptortus Stål, 1860
 Robustocephalus Ahmad, Abbas, Shadab & Khan, 1979
 Slateria Ahmad, 1965
 Stachyocnemus Stål, 1870
 Stachyolobus Stål, 1871
 Stenocoris Burmeister, 1839 (rice bugs)
 Tenosius Stål, 1860
 Tollius Stål, 1870
 Trachelium Herrich-Schäffer, 1850
 Tuberculiformia Ahmad, 1967
 Tupalus Stål, 1860
 Zulubius Bergroth, 1894
 † Heeralydus Štys & Riha, 1975
 † Orthriocorisa Scudder, 1890
 † Sulcalydus Štys & Riha, 1975
 † Willershausenia Popov, 2007

References

 
Coreoidea
Heteroptera families